Abdelhak "Appie" Nouri (born 2 April 1997) is a Dutch former professional footballer who played as a midfielder. He operated primarily as an attacking midfielder, but could also be deployed as a winger.

A youth product of Eredivisie club Ajax, Nouri played two years of senior football with its reserve team and the first team. He also represented the Netherlands at various youth levels.

In July 2017, at age 20, during a pre-season friendly match, Nouri collapsed and suffered a cardiac arrhythmia attack, which left him with severe and permanent brain damage and unable to continue his career as a footballer.

Early life
Nouri was born in Amsterdam and is of Moroccan descent. He made his name as a footballer largely in his youth, attracting attention from multiple publications as a future star. He was named as one of the best 40 youth players in the world by The Guardian in 2014, before he made his professional debut.

Club career
Nouri was a youth exponent from the academy at Ajax, and made his professional debut for the reserve side, Jong Ajax, on 13 March 2015, in an Eerste Divisie game against VVV Venlo, replacing Danny Bakker after 78 minutes in a 1–0 loss.

On 21 September 2016, Nouri made his official first-team debut in a KNVB Cup match against Willem II, and scored a goal. His exploits throughout the season for Jong Ajax saw him being gifted the Player of the Season award for the 2016–17 season, as well as promotion to the first team for the 2017–18 season.

Collapse

On 8 July 2017, Nouri collapsed during a friendly match against Werder Bremen, due to cardiac arrhythmia. He was taken to the hospital by a trauma helicopter, and his condition was announced as stable. Five days later, however, Ajax reported that Nouri had suffered severe and permanent brain damage as a direct result of the incident, and was in intensive care. Nouri eventually left intensive care on 25 July 2017, being able to breathe unaided, but will not be able to play football again. In June 2018, Ajax announced an investigation had found that the medical treatment Nouri received on the field was "inadequate", which prompted a lawsuit from Nouri's family against Ajax through the Royal Dutch Football Association's arbitration panel, who stated a failure to resuscitate him with due haste was responsible for causing his brain damage.

By August 2018, Nouri was no longer in a coma and was able to recognise and communicate with members of his family by moving his mouth and eyebrows. By September 2019, Nouri was confirmed to still be in hospital. On 27 March 2020, Nouri's family confirmed he had awoken from his coma and returned home to his family, where he will continue to receive treatment. Shortly afterwards, Ajax announced they cancelled Nouri's contract, which was due to automatically renew on 1 July, and that they were in talks with his family about a "future solution" for Nouri. In February 2022, Ajax announced the agreement with Nouri's family included a payment of €7.85 million, that the club would cover all his medical bills, and would retire his number 34 jersey.

Tributes 
Following Nouri's retirement, several tributes were conducted in his honour in and outside football. In December 2018, Ajax renamed their "Talent of the Future" award after Nouri, while a number of Nouri's former club and international teammates, including Justin Kluivert, Philippe Sandler, Amin Younes, Donny van de Beek, Kevin Diks, Joël Veltman, Anwar El Ghazi, and Sofyan Amrabat adopted Nouri's shirt number (34) at their new clubs. Ajax's 34th league championship was dedicated to Nouri by the players, who celebrated with his father during the trophy presentation in May 2019. On 12 June 2022, a square in Amsterdam Nieuw-West was renamed the "A. Nouri Plein".

Honours
Ajax
 UEFA Europa League: runner-up 2016–17
Individual
 Best player of AEGON Future Cup: 2014
 UEFA European Under-19 Championship Team of the Tournament: 2016
Eerste Divisie Player of the Season: 2016–17

See also
 List of people who awoke from a coma

References

External links
 

1997 births
Living people
Dutch sportspeople of Moroccan descent
Footballers from Amsterdam
Dutch footballers
Association football midfielders
Jong Ajax players
AFC Ajax players
Eerste Divisie players
Eredivisie players
Netherlands youth international footballers
People with hypoxic and ischemic brain injuries